Báscones is one of 28 parishes (administrative divisions) in the municipality of Grado, within the province and autonomous community of Asturias, in northern Spain. 

The population is 266 (INE 2007).

Villages and hamlets
 Báscones
 Belandres
 Borondes
 Fuejo (Fuexu)
 Las Casucas
 Casas del Monte
 Nalió
 Nores

References  

Parishes in Grado